Pietro Ranieri was a Roman Catholic prelate who served as Bishop of Strongoli (1535–1541).

Biography
On 15 November 1535, Pietro Ranieri was appointed by Pope Paul III as Bishop of Strongoli.
On 7 December 1535, he was consecrated bishop by Giovanni De Rosa, Bishop of Krk with Giacomo Ponzetti, Bishop of Molfetta, and Alfonso Oliva, Bishop of Bovino, serving as co-consecrators.
He served as Bishop of Strongoli until his resignation in 1541.

References

External links and additional sources
 (for Chronology of Bishops) 
 (for Chronology of Bishops) 

16th-century Italian Roman Catholic bishops
Bishops appointed by Pope Paul III